"Tambourine" is a hip hop song written by Eve, Swizz Beatz, and Sean Garrett.  The song samples "Blow Your Whistle" from The Soul Searchers. It was released in 2007 (see 2007 in music), becoming Eve's first charting single as a lead performer in over four years. In the week of April 19, 2007, the song debuted at number 73 on the Billboard Hot R&B/Hip-Hop Songs chart, where it continued to gain momentum. The song has also been made available for purchase as a single on iTunes. In the United Kingdom, "Tambourine" debuted at number 38, two weeks before the song's physical release. The song peaked at number 18 there and was her fifth consecutive top twenty solo hit in the UK. The B-side to "Tambourine" is "Dancefloor" featuring Mashonda. The song features uncredited vocals by the song's producer Swizz Beatz (he is not credited as a featured performer). The song was #68 on Rolling Stones list of the 100 Best Songs of 2007, and was also #70 on MTV Asia's list of Top 100 Hits of 2007.

Music video
The music video directed by Melina Matsoukas premiered on the night of May 24, 2007, after Eve's episode of BET's Access Granted which featured the making of the video. Eve stated that she wanted the scenes in the video to be colorful. Swizz Beatz and Ya Boy make cameos in the video. The video starts off with four maids dancing and knocking on Eve's door. Upon entering, they begin to shower Eve with things, which she rejects, then they start dancing while imitating a tambourine. Then the video cuts to Eve tanning and getting ready for a party. Throughout the video, Swizz Beatz is seen as cameos. Then Eve gets into a car driven by Swizz Beatz and they arrive at a party where there is dancing and a woman spitting out beer.

Usage in media
The track is featured in the movies Fantastic Four: Rise of the Silver Surfer, Meet the Spartans, The Boss, Trainwreck, Wild Child, Bride Wars, Big Mommas, in the television series Skins (season 3, episode 2), Gossip Girl (season 1, episode 4), Girls (season 2, episode 3) and the season four finale of Station 19, and in NBA Live 08''.

Remixes
The official remix features new verses by rappers Swizz Beatz, Missy Elliott, Fabolous, and Eve.

Track listing
US vinyl:
 "Tambourine" (clean)
 "Tambourine" (dirty)
 "Tambourine" (instrumental)
 "Tambourine" (a cappella)

US vinyl:
 "Tambourine" (Remix) (radio) (featuring Fabolous & Missy Elliott)
 "Tambourine" (Remix) (instrumental)
 "Tambourine" (Remix) (LP) (featuring Fabolous & Missy Elliott)

UK CD:
 "Tambourine" (radio edit)
 "Dance Floor" (featuring Mashonda)

UK vinyl:
 "Tambourine" (radio edit)
 "Tambourine" (album version)
 "Tambourine" (instrumental)
 "Dance Floor" (featuring Mashonda)

EU CD:
 "Tambourine" (radio edit)
 "Tambourine" (instrumental)
 "Tambourine" (album version)
 "Tambourine" (video)

Charts

Weekly charts

Year-end charts

Certifications

References

2007 singles
Eve (rapper) songs
Music videos directed by Melina Matsoukas
Song recordings produced by Swizz Beatz
Songs written by Swizz Beatz
Songs written by Sean Garrett
Aftermath Entertainment singles
Geffen Records singles
Interscope Records singles
Ruff Ryders Entertainment singles
2007 songs
Songs written by Eve (rapper)